An independence referendum was held in the Estonian SSR on 3 March 1991, alongside a similar referendum in the Latvian SSR the same day. It was approved by 78.4% of voters with an 82.9% turnout. Independence was restored by the Estonian Supreme Council on the night of 20 August.

Results
Voters were asked "Do you want the restoration of the national independence and sovereignty of the Republic of Estonia?"

See also
1991 Latvian independence and democracy referendum
1991 Lithuanian independence referendum
1991 Soviet Union referendum

References

Singing Revolution
Referendums in Estonia
Referendums in the Soviet Union
Estonia
Independence
Estonia
Estonia
Dissolution of the Soviet Union